Jumbo Elliott may refer to:

Jumbo Elliott (coach) (James Elliott, 1915–1981),  American track and field coach
Jumbo Elliott (American football) (John Stuart Elliott, born 1965),  American football player
Jumbo Elliott (baseball) (James Thomas Elliott, 1900–1970),  baseball pitcher